The One Piece video games series is published by Bandai and Banpresto, later as part of Bandai Namco Entertainment, and is based on Eiichiro Oda's shonen manga and anime series of the same name. The games take place in the fictional world of One Piece, and the stories revolve around the adventures of Monkey D. Luffy and his Straw Hat Pirates, the franchise's protagonists. The games have been released on a variety of video game and handheld consoles. The series features various genres, mostly role-playing games (the predominant type in the series' early years) and fighting games, such as the games in the Grand Battle! sub-series.

The series debuted in Japan on July 19, 2000 with From TV Animation – One Piece: Become the Pirate King! (One Piece: Mezase Kaizoku Ou!). The series contains 56 games including 11 mobile games, not counting appearances in crossover entries.

More than five years passed after the anime series' debut, One Piece: Grand Battle! Rush, was released outside Japan on September 7, 2005. Out of 38 games (not including non-Japanese games), 11 have been released in North America, two in Australia, and 13 in Europe. Japan's large demand for such games leads its companies to produce the games with haste and thus low regard for quality. The opposite is the case with the One Piece video game, which has been produced for and exclusively released to the North American markets, and was crowned "GBA Platformer of the Year" in 2005 by GameSpy's network of game websites. The One Piece games have received mixed reception; assessments ranged from "slightly below or slightly above average" to "a grand video-game series".

Series

One Piece: Grand Battle!

One Piece: Unlimited

One Piece: Pirate Warriors

Other video games

Mobile video games

Mobile games not in operation

Related games that feature One Piece characters

Commercial reception

Japan retail

See also
 List of One Piece media

References

External links
Official Bandai Namco Europe website

One Piece (video game series)
One Piece (video game series)
Games
One Piece
Toei Animation video game projects